Tingvoll Church is a parish church of the Church of Norway in Tingvoll Municipality in Møre og Romsdal county, Norway. It is located in the village of Tingvollvågen. It is the church for the Tingvoll parish which is part of the Indre Nordmøre prosti (deanery) in the Diocese of Møre. The stone church was built in a long church style during the second half of the 1100s by an unknown architect. The church seats about 430 people.

History
The church is one of the few remaining old stone churches that was built in Norway. The earliest existing historical records of the church date back to the year 1333, but it was not new that year. There is some uncertainty as to when it was actually constructed, but records indicate it was between 1150 and 1200. The church was built here, since during the pre-Christian era, Tingvoll was an assembly place for all of the Nordmøre region. As a consequence the church is sometimes called Nordmørsdomen, meaning the Nordmøre cathedral. The centuries-old Romanesque style Tingvoll church and the large angular farmhouse beside it, lie on a spot on the north side of the Tingvollfjorden, just outside the village of Tingvollvågen off of Norwegian National Road 70 (Rv70). 

In 1814, this church served as an election church. Together with more than 300 other parish churches across Norway, it was a polling station for elections to the 1814 Norwegian Constituent Assembly which wrote the Constitution of Norway. This was Norway's first national elections. Each church parish was a constituency that elected people called "electors" who later met together in each county to elect the representatives for the assembly that was to meet in Eidsvoll later that year.

Design
The corridors lead to steep stairs up to the crown of the wall under the rafters and then down again with the same steep pitch. It is a mystery why they were constructed. So also a balcony outside under the gable, located above the chancel. The church is richly decorated. From the painted walls in the weaponhouse, the whitewash paintings inside the nave, to the arc ceiling in the chancel which is adorned with stars and half moons. In the chancel wall, behind the top of the altarpiece, there is a marble rock with runic inscriptions. This inscription contains a prayer and also what is believed to be the name of a person named Gunnar who built the church. In 1928-1929 the church underwent some restoration work.

Media gallery

See also
List of churches in Møre

References

External links
 Tingvoll church

Tingvoll
Churches in Møre og Romsdal
Long churches in Norway
Stone churches in Norway
12th-century churches in Norway
12th-century establishments in Norway
Norwegian election church